An appeal to pity (also called argumentum ad misericordiam, the sob story, or the Galileo argument)  is a fallacy in which someone tries to win support for an argument or idea by exploiting one's opponent's feelings of pity or guilt. It is a specific kind of appeal to emotion. The name "Galileo argument" refers to the scientist's suffering as a result of his house arrest by the Inquisition.

Examples
 "You must have graded my exam incorrectly. I studied very hard for weeks specifically because I knew my career depended on getting a good grade. If you give me a failing grade I'm ruined!"
 "Ladies and gentlemen of the jury, look at this miserable man, in a wheelchair, unable to use his legs. Could such a man really be guilty of embezzlement?"

See also
 Appeal to consequences

Notes

Pity